The William H. Gleason House is a historic home in Melbourne, Florida, United States.  The house was built around 1884 by William Henry Gleason (c. 1829–1902) and his wife Sarah Griffin Gleason  and is at 1736 Pineapple Avenue in the Eau Gallie neighborhood founded by the Gleasons before incorporating with Melbourne in 1969.  Gleason House is an outstanding example of Queen Anne style architecture.  On January 25, 1997, it was added to the U.S. National Register of Historic Places.

See also
William Henry Gleason
William Henry Hunt Gleason

References and external links

Brevard County listings at National Register of Historic Places
 Old Pineapple Inn - Website of the Old Pineapple Inn, a bed and breakfast inn operated at the Gleason House.

Houses in Brevard County, Florida
National Register of Historic Places in Brevard County, Florida
Buildings and structures in Melbourne, Florida